Nebraska Highway 12 is a highway in northern and northeastern Nebraska.  It has a western terminus at U.S. Highway 83 in Valentine and an eastern terminus at U.S. Highway 20 west of Jackson.  The highway largely lies within 10 miles (16 km) of the South Dakota border its entire length.  The highway has been designated the Outlaw Trail Scenic Byway.

Route description
Nebraska Highway 12 begins at an intersection with US 83 in Valentine, Nebraska.  It goes northeast out of Valentine through the Fort Niobrara National Wildlife Refuge before turning east.  It also provides the easiest link to Smith Falls State Park.  It passes through Sparks, then turns southeasterly towards Springview, where it meets U.S. Highway 183.  After a brief concurrency with US 183 north, it turns east and briefly overlaps Nebraska Highway 137 before continuing eastward to another concurrency with Nebraska Highway 11 in Butte.  It goes south out of Butte, then turns east and meets U.S. Highway 281 in Spencer, which it also overlaps.  It continues eastward through the tribal lands of the Ponca Tribe of Nebraska and around the edge of Niobrara State Park.  It then crosses the Niobrara River and enters the village of Niobrara, Nebraska, where it meets Nebraska Highway 14.

NE 12 and NE 14 continue eastward together from Niobrara until NE 14 turns north to go across into South Dakota.  NE 12 continues east through the Santee Indian Reservation and continues due east through Crofton, Nebraska.  It continues on the same line eastward, intersecting U.S. Highway 81 in the process, then turns southeastward near Wynot.  It meets Nebraska Highway 15 and the two routes are paired together through Obert and Maskell before NE 15 turns north to go toward Vermillion, South Dakota.  It angles through Newcastle and Ponca.  It turns briefly south, then goes southeast to end west of Jackson at an intersection with U.S. Highway 20.

Major intersections

References

External links

 The Nebraska Highways Page: Highways 1 to 30
 Nebraska Roads: NE 11-20

012
Transportation in Cherry County, Nebraska
Transportation in Keya Paha County, Nebraska
Transportation in Boyd County, Nebraska
Transportation in Knox County, Nebraska
Transportation in Cedar County, Nebraska
Transportation in Dixon County, Nebraska
Transportation in Dakota County, Nebraska